Gălbinași is a commune in Călărași County, Muntenia, Romania. It is composed of a single village, Gălbinași. It was a village of Vasilați Commune until 2005, when it was split off to form a separate commune.

As of 2011 the population of Gălbinași is 3,772.

References

Communes in Călărași County
Localities in Muntenia